Bug is a 2006 psychological thriller film directed by William Friedkin and written by Tracy Letts, based on his 1996 play of the same name. The film stars Ashley Judd, Michael Shannon, Lynn Collins, Brían F. O'Byrne, and Harry Connick Jr.

Bug debuted at the 2006 Cannes Film Festival before being purchased by Lionsgate, which released the film the following year in May 2007. The film received mixed to positive reviews from critics, who praised its intensity, directing, acting, and take on paranoia, but were polarized about its writing. They disagreed about the ending in particular. Friedkin and Letts collaborated again as director and writer on the 2011 film Killer Joe.

Plot
Agnes White is a waitress working at a gay bar while living in a run-down motel in rural Oklahoma. Unable to move on after the disappearance of her young son Lloyd nearly ten years ago, Agnes binges on drugs and alcohol with her lesbian friend R.C.

Agnes is constantly plagued by silent telephone calls that she believes are being made by her abusive ex-husband Jerry Goss, who has recently been paroled. Jerry had previously attempted to murder her, and stalked her prior to his arrest in spite of Agnes filing a restraining order against him. One night, R.C. introduces Agnes to Peter Evans, a socially awkward yet courteous drifter. Agnes quickly strikes up a bond with Peter over their mutual loneliness, and she allows Peter to stay the night. The pair's sleep is interrupted by a malfunctioning smoke alarm, which Peter destroys with a Magic 8 Ball handed to him by Agnes.

The next morning, Jerry barges into Agnes's room while Peter is out getting food. After menacing her, Jerry attempts to reconcile. However, when Agnes insults him, Jerry punches her. Jerry leaves, declaring he will return and pushing a returning Peter out of the way. Peter comforts Agnes, and the two have sex that night.

However, Peter wakes Agnes up in the middle of the night, having apparently found an aphid in the bed. A paranoid Peter kills a number of them, and reveals he is being pursued. However, he refuses to tell Agnes who is hunting him on the grounds it will put her in danger and flees. Agnes, feeling abandoned, bursts into tears and a remorseful Peter returns. Peter reveals himself to be a veteran of The Gulf War. He claims that he was subjected to biological testing by the U.S. government, that the anonymous phone calls were made by government agents in anticipation of his arrival, and that the room has become infested by bugs planted by the government as part of the experiments. Peter's movements and behavior become more erratic as he fights the "invisible" bugs, that he claims are infesting his body.

Over time, Agnes begins to share in his behavior. R.C., who has taken Agnes to visit a dermatologist, is convinced there are no bugs in the motel room. Agnes has also reported to the motel owner that their room has bugs but says he told her none of the other rooms have a bug problem. Peter is furious over these developments. R.C. tries to convince Agnes to leave Peter, mentioning that a man named Dr. Sweet is looking for him. But, after Peter has an episode, Agnes slaps R.C. and tells her to leave. Peter and Agnes isolate themselves, closing the room, covering it with flypaper and aluminum foil to fend off communications, and lighting it with the glow from bug zappers. Peter, believing that a colony of microscopic bug egg-sacs was implanted in one of his teeth, tears the tooth out with pliers. After examining the tooth using a child's microscope, he believes he sees the bugs in the remains of the crushed tooth, as does Agnes. Peter is progressively more obsessed with using the microscope, believing that the bugs are living in and eating his blood.

Dr. Sweet arrives at the motel with Jerry. After Jerry bursts in, Sweet sends him outside. Sweet tells Agnes that Peter escaped from a mental institution where he was undergoing treatment and that delusions about insects are a known symptom of Peter's mental illness. Agnes distrusts Sweet, who goes on to claim that he knows where Lloyd is and that the bugs are in fact real. Sweet attempts to convince her that he can help Agnes and Peter escape from the conspiracy.

Peter appears from the bedroom wielding a knife. As he argues with Sweet, Sweet unobtrusively readies a syringe, preparing to sedate Peter, but Peter stabs and savagely kills Sweet. Agnes is distraught believing that Peter has destroyed her chance of learning more about her son, but Peter insists Sweet was not even human, merely a 'robot' sent by the government. Together, Peter and Agnes elaborate upon Peter's beliefs in an escalating conspiracy, becoming convinced that Agnes's son was kidnapped by the government to lead her and Peter to meet. They believe that each was separately infected with bugs meant to mate with each another (one being the 'drone' and one being the 'Queen') and take over the world. To prevent this, Agnes and Peter decide douse each other in gasoline. Jerry, furious over his ex-wife's unstable behaviour, tries to break into the room but Agnes injures him with a nailgun. Agnes and Peter declare their love for each other before setting themselves ablaze.

During the end credits, various toys in Agnes's room are shown completely intact, with no sign of the aluminum foil. The opening shot of the film is repeated with the body of Sweet lying prone in the foil-covered room which is undamaged by fire. It is left unclear which shot, if any, is "real".

Cast
 Ashley Judd as Agnes White
 Michael Shannon as Peter Evans
 Lynn Collins as R.C.
 Brían F. O'Byrne as Dr. Sweet
 Harry Connick, Jr. as Jerry Goss

Production

Settings
The set design was done by Franco-Giacomo Carbone, the production designer of films such as Hostel (2005) and Rocky Balboa (2006).

Most of the film's action occurs in a seedy motel room. The scenario has three interconnected rooms — a bathroom, a kitchenette and a living room. At one point in the film, the room has several dozen fly strips hanging from the ceiling. At another point the entire room is covered from floor to ceiling in tinfoil. Friedkin has said the tinfoil was a nightmare to work with, because it had to be repaired constantly, and because it reflected everybody who was there, including the crew.

Filming locations
Exteriors of the motel were filmed near Olancha, California, and at Grace King High School while studio interiors of the motel room were filmed on a soundstage (a high school gymnasium) in Metairie, Louisiana, near New Orleans. A grocery store scene was shot at Migliore's Grocery, and the lesbian bar scene was shot at Boomerang's Bar, both located in New Sarpy, Louisiana. The movie took 21 days to shoot.

The story is supposed to take place in Oklahoma, but the Sierra Nevada mountain range behind the motel belies the shooting location.

Music
The film score was composed by Brian Tyler, with additional music by Serj Tankian. The end title song "Disappearing Act" was written and performed by Chris Cornell. Jay Faires was the film's music supervisor.

Soundtrack

The film's theme song is performed by Serj Tankian, the lead singer of the rock band System of a Down. "Beautiful Day" is performed by Scott Weiland, the lead singer of the rock band Stone Temple Pilots.

Additional artists are Sean and Sara Watkins (of Nickel Creek), Chainsaw Kittens, The Backsliders, Susan Tedeschi, Jerry Leiber, The Coasters, Alvin Robinson, Los Tigres del Norte, Leon Russell, and Brian Tyler.

The soundtrack was released in stores on May 22, 2007.

Release
Distributed by Lionsgate, the film premiered in May 2006 in France in the Directors' Fortnight section at the 2006 Cannes Film Festival.

The film received its U.S. premiere at Fantastic Fest on September 25, 2006, in Austin, Texas. It opened in the U.S. at 1,661 theaters on May 25, 2007. In its opening weekend it earned $3.24 million, and ranked as number four, of the most-seen films of the weekend, placed behind the popular franchise films Pirates of the Caribbean 3, Shrek 3 and Spider-Man 3.

It was released to theaters in France on February 21, 2007. It drew praise from most critics in France, but did not reach the top in the box office. In its opening week in France, it ranked as number twenty of the most-visited films of the week, and earned $216,244 from sixty-six screens.

Genre
Friedkin has said that the film would have been flagged, in the 1960s or 1970s, as a horror film, but he insists it is no such thing. He told ComingSoon.net that "There were all sorts of people who looked at Bug, (including magazine people like Fangoria) and they called it a horror film," he said. The horror connection "came from a lot of sources." Friedkin claims that Bug is "in many ways, a black comedy love story. He stated in an interview, that "It's not a genre film, but marketing works in mysterious ways. They have to find a genre for it. 'This is a comedy. This is a melodrama. This is a love story. This is a horror film. This is an adventure film.' Bug doesn't fit easily into any of those categories."

Home media
Bug was released on DVD on September 20, 2007. It was also available on HD DVD as a German exclusive, and has subsequently been released on Blu-ray Disc in Germany as well. A North American Blu-ray Disc release never materialized.

Reception
The film received mixed to positive reviews from critics. , the film holds a 61% approval rating of review aggregator Rotten Tomatoes, based on 132 reviews with an average rating of 6.25/10. The consensus states: "Disappointing resolution aside, Bug uses its claustrophobic setting and cinéma vérité camerawork to tense, impressive effect". Metacritic reports an average score of 62 out of 100, indicating "generally favorable reviews" based on 29 reviews.

At Cannes, Chicago Sun-Times critic Roger Ebert remarked, "The film has caused a stir at Cannes, not least because its stars, Ashley Judd and Michael Shannon, achieve a kind of manic intensity that's frightening not just in itself but because you fear for the actors." A year later, he awarded the film 3 stars out of 4, describing it in his review as "lean, direct, unrelenting" and calling it "a return to form after some disappointments like Jade." He also acknowledged others' criticism of its single-location setting, which he defended by writing, "There is nothing here to 'open up' and every reason to create a claustrophobic feel. Paranoia shuts down into a desperate focus. It doesn't spread its wings and fly."

Judd was praised for her performance by critic Dennis Dermody from Paper, who wrote: "Ashley Judd gives a raw, shattering Oscar-worthy performance." Stephen Schaeffer from the Boston Herald called it "one of the most disturbing horror movies imaginable". The film received generally positive reviews from the U.K. media, receiving three out of five in The Guardian. It was also critic Mark Kermode's film of the week on BBC Radio 5 Live.

Despite the praise, CinemaScore gave it a rating of "F" based on surveys from general audiences.

Awards
The film received an award at the 2006 Cannes Film Festival from the International Federation of Film Critics in the Director's Fortnight section.

Judd was nominated for a Saturn Award for Best Actress.

See also

 Delusional parasitosis
 Folie à deux
 Gulf War syndrome
 Morgellons disease
 Paranoia

References

External links

 

2006 thriller films
2006 independent films
2006 psychological thriller films
2000s psychological thriller films
American films based on plays
American independent films
American psychological thriller films
German thriller films
German independent films
German psychological thriller films
English-language German films
Films scored by Brian Tyler
Films directed by William Friedkin
Films set in Oklahoma
Films shot in California
Films shot in Louisiana
American psychological films
Lionsgate films
Films about mental disorders
Delusional parasitosis
2000s English-language films
2000s American films
2000s German films